The Franklin Cider Mill, known previously as the Franklin Grist Mill, is a cider mill located in  Franklin, Michigan.

The family of former owner Jacob Peltz continues to operate the mill. The mill offers fresh apple cider, spice donuts, caramel apples, and apple pies and  other  products.

History 
 
The Franklin Grist Mill was completed in 1837 after three years of construction. The construction was started by W. Matthews.  Matthews purchased the large tract of land near the Mill’s current location and began the mill in 1832.  Due to financial difficulties, Matthews could not finish his project. The property was purchased by Peter VanEvery who completed the building and opened it as a gristmill on the banks of the Franklin River.

Ownership of the Mill changed hands several times during the late 19th and early 20th centuries. In 1914, the mill was sold to James T. Flynn, who installed the first water-powered apple press. Around the turn of the century, the Franklin Grist Mill was flooded and shut down until the property was purchased in 1918 by Robert McKee.  McKee stipulated that the cider season would run from August 15th until January 1st.

In the 1960s the mill was again sold to Jacob Peltz who operated the mill for almost 35 years until his death in 2004.

References

External links 
 Franklin Cider Mill

Buildings and structures in Oakland County, Michigan
Buildings and structures in Michigan
Landmarks in Michigan
Companies based in Oakland County, Michigan
Tourist attractions in Oakland County, Michigan